Balázs Koszó (born 20 March 1988) is a Hungarian football player who plays for Balassagyarmat.

External links
Player Balázs Koszó at HLSZ 

1988 births
Living people
People from Kecskemét
Hungarian footballers
Association football midfielders
Kecskeméti TE players
Bőcs KSC footballers
Szigetszentmiklósi TK footballers
Békéscsaba 1912 Előre footballers
Dunaújváros PASE players
Mosonmagyaróvári TE 1904 footballers
Zalaegerszegi TE players
Győri ETO FC players
Szeged-Csanád Grosics Akadémia footballers
BKV Előre SC footballers
Balassagyarmati SE footballers
Nemzeti Bajnokság I players
Nemzeti Bajnokság II players
Nemzeti Bajnokság III players
Sportspeople from Bács-Kiskun County